Khargone Lok Sabha constituency is one of the 29 Lok Sabha (parliamentary) constituencies in the Indian state of Madhya Pradesh state in central India. This constituency came into existence in 1962. It is reserved for the candidates belonging to the Scheduled Tribes and covers the entire Barwani district and part of Khargone district.

Vidhan Sabha Assembly segments
Presently, Khargone Lok Sabha constituency comprises the following eight Vidhan Sabha segments:

Members of Parliament

^ by poll

Election results

General election 2019

General election 2014

General election 2009

See also
 Khargone district
 Barwani district
 List of Constituencies of the Lok Sabha

References

Lok Sabha constituencies in Madhya Pradesh
Khargone district